Çeltik ("paddy, rice in a husk") is a town and district of Konya Province in the Central Anatolia region of Turkey. According to 2000 census, population of the district is 14,460 of which 4,692 live in the town of Çeltik.

Notes

References

External links
 District governor's official website 
 District municipality's official website 

Populated places in Konya Province
Districts of Konya Province